Gadi Eisenkot or Eizenkot (born 19 May 1960) was the 21st Chief of General Staff of the Israel Defense Forces (16 February 2015 – 15 January 2019). He is the originator of the so-called Dahiya doctrine.

Biography
Gadi Eisenkot was born in Tiberias, in northern Israel. He is the second of four children born to Meir and Esther Eizenkot, Jewish Moroccan immigrants from the town of Safi. His mother was born in Casablanca, and his father was born in Marrakesh. It is thought that the family name was originally Azenkot and was changed to Eisenkot by a clerk after his father immigrated to Israel. After his parents divorced, his father remarried and had four more children.

Eisenkot grew up in the southern port city of Eilat, and studied at Goldwater High School, majoring in maritime studies. After high school he was drafted to the Israel Defense Forces (IDF) and served in the Golani Brigade.

He graduated with a (B.A.) in History from Tel Aviv University and later completed a post-graduate degree at Haifa University in Political science.

He is married and the father of five children. He currently resides in Herzliya.

Military career 
Eisenkot did his military service in the Golani Brigade, of which he became commander in 1997–98. He served as a soldier, a squad leader and a platoon leader. In the First Lebanon War he served as a Company commander in the Golani brigade. During the South Lebanon conflict (1985–2000) he served as the brigade's Operations Officer and as the commander of the Golani Orev Company. Later, he served as Golani's 13th Battalion commander, the Deputy to the Commander of the Brigade and an operations officer of the Northern Command. Afterwards he served as Carmeli Brigade's commander and as the commander of the Ephraim Brigade. In 1997 he replaced Col. Erez Gerstein and was appointed commander of the Golani Brigade. During that time Eizenkot led the brigade in a series of operations in southern Lebanon that resulted 40 Hezbollah operatives killed.

In 1999 Eizenkot was selected to be the Military Secretary for the Prime Minister and the Minister of Defense under then Prime Minister Ehud Barak. Since then he has commanded the 366th Division and the Judea and Samaria Division, where he led the Campaign against Palestinian political violence. He was promoted to head of Israeli Operations Directorate in June 2005. After the conclusions exercise "joining of forces" Eizenkot led the formulation of the concept on which the IDF must severely damage the center of gravity of Hezbollah, the Dahiya neighborhood, as a key component for creating deterrence against Hezbollah. During the Second Lebanon War he was one of the few generals of the General Staff who dared to disagree with the Chief of Staff, Dan Halutz, and the measures proposed. Among other things he argued, at the beginning of the war, that the IDF must raise the reserve forces to improve preparedness for a large-scale ground offensive, and stressed that Israel must strive for a quick end of the war.

After Maj. Gen. Udi Adam resigned in October 2006 amid criticism over his conduct in the 2006 Lebanon War, Eizenkot replaced him as head of the Northern Command. In his years as the head of the Northern Command he emphasizes the training of forces, strengthening the capacities of command and creating an appropriate operational response to threats from Hezbollah and Syria.

On 11 July 2011, the position was transferred to Maj. Gen. Yair Golan. Afterwards he served as Deputy Chief of General Staff in place of Maj. Gen. Yair Naveh, assuming office on 14 January 2013. On 28 November 2014, Defense Minister Moshe Ya'alon and Prime Minister Benjamin Netanyahu chose Eizenkot as the successor to Gen. Benny Gantz as the Chief of Staff of the IDF.

Chief of Staff of the IDF 

Eizenkot took office on 16 February 2015. Upon taking office he began to promote measures to strengthen the ground forces, including infantry training reinforcement and armor, reducing the volume of reserve forces on the one hand and reinforcing the amount of training on the other hand. In addition he emphasizes the training of forces regarding the threat of tunnels. Eizenkot Ordered the implementation of the multi-year plan "Gideon" that was formed under his direction. "Gideon" was presented in July 2015 and it was approved by the cabinet in April 2016. The plan involves a variety of issues which such as force buildup to a range of threats, strengthening and developing the IDF's maneuvering capabilities, eliminating redundant arrays and the constructing a cyber command. At the heart of multi-year plan stands "The IDF Strategy". This document, published in August 2015, defined three core elements: perception of use of force, the concept of command and control and the principles of the force buildup derived from these perceptions. In the document Eizenkot determines the ultimate test of military action is the ability to sustain long periods of peace and safety in order to allow the state to develop. The long periods of peace and safety are the result of deterrence achieved through military strength and the use of force. The strategy defines two types of campaigns: 
 A campaign to achieve Decisive victory, in which the IDF will operate at its full strength in order to achieve its goals.
 A limited campaign, in which the IDF will operate its force in restraint in order prevent escalation.

An essential element relates to the purpose of ending the conflict in the shortest time. "The IDF Strategy" attempts to achieve this response by changing the pattern of the use of force utilizing an immediate and simultaneous attack that combines maneuver and fire. "The IDF Strategy" also includes the strategic concept of campaigns between the wars (CBW), in which the IDF operate covertly in order to preserve and enhance the achievements of the previous campaigns, to weaken the enemy and to postpone the next conflict. 
In August 2016 Eizenkot was awarded with the Commander of the Legion of Merit by general Joseph Dunford. The award was given due to Eizenkot's "exceptionally meritorious service as chief of the General Staff of the IDF" and his "contribution to the strategic cooperation between the United States and Israel will have a lasting effect on both countries".

Political views
Eisenkot believes in a country whose vision reflects national-Jewish values. At the same time, he believes that the state must maintain equal rights for all its citizens regardless of religion, nationality, race and gender. 

Eisenkot believes in separating from the Palestinians (to a two state solution) in order to avoid a bi-national state and to maintain a Jewish-democratic state, with permanent conservation of the Jordan Valley and the settlement blocs. In the Gaza Strip, Eisenkot seeks a long-term cease-fire agreement, the return of captives, a complete demobilization of the ability to launch missiles and rockets, and under these conditions he will agree to rehabilitation measures for the Gaza Strip that include the opening of a seaport.

From an overall security perspective, he sees importance in promoting an active and uncompromising security policy to advance security interests, while demonstrating security power, in order to continue to erode enemy capabilities and deter hostile elements who have not yet come to terms with the existence of the State of Israel.

Eisenkot believes that Israel's enemies are not an existential threats to the State of Israel, but domestic polarization is. Therefore, he claims that the people of Israel must stop the campaign of boycotting each other in order to find lines of connection between political camps, and not let a distancer and a divider lead the people of Israel.

Eisenkot demands the promotion of reforms that will strengthen the separation of powers.

Awards and decorations

References

External links
 
 Gadi Eisenkot and Gabi Siboni, Guidelines for Israel's National Security Strategy , The Washington Institute for Near East Policy, October 2019.
 Gadi Eisenkot and Gabi Siboni, The Campaign Between Wars: How Israel Rethought Its Strategy to Counter Iran’s Malign Regional Influence, The Washington Institute for Near East Policy, 4 September 2019.
 Thirteen Years Since the Hezbollah-Israel War, The Washington Institute for Near East Policy, 8 July 2019.

1960 births
Living people
Israeli generals
People from Eilat
People from Tiberias
Israeli people of Moroccan-Jewish descent
University of Haifa alumni
Tel Aviv University alumni
Commanders of the Legion of Merit
Chiefs of the General Staff (Israel)